"Captive Market" is a science fiction short story by American writer Philip K. Dick, first published in the April 1955 issue of If and later in The Minority Report.  In it, an old woman uses her ability to travel through time to exploit a special market - a group of survivors in a post-apocalyptic world, struggling to repair a rocket to take them to Venus.

References

External links
 Captive Market at the Internet Archive

1955 short stories
Short stories by Philip K. Dick